Ar Angel Aviles is a Filipino child actress, known for Magpakailanman and Destiny Rose. The first Philippine TV-series that she first appeared in GMA was Rhodora X which stars Jennylyn Mercado, Mark Herras, Yasmien Kurdi, and Mark Anthony Fernandez. She was impressive in her acting performance in Rhodora X.

Filmography 
Television series

References 

Filipino child actresses
Living people
Filipino television actresses
2003 births